Bebelis leo is a species of beetle in the family Cerambycidae. It was described by Monne and Monne in 2009.

References

Bebelis
Beetles described in 2009